Komagataeibacter is a genus of bacteria in the family Acetobacteraceae. It was described in 2012 by Yamada et al. The type species is Komagataeibacter xylinus.

Species 
The genus contains the following species:
 Komagataeibacter cocois Liu et al. 2018
 Komagataeibacter diospyri Naloka et al. 2020
 Komagataeibacter europaeus (Sievers et al. 1992) Yamada et al. 2013
 Komagataeibacter hansenii (Gosselé et al. 1983) Yamada et al. 2013
 Komagataeibacter intermedius (Boesch et al. 1998) Yamada et al. 2013
 Komagataeibacter kakiaceti (Iino et al. 2012) Yamada 2014
 Komagataeibacter kombuchae (Dutta and Gachhui 2007) Yamada et al. 2013
 Komagataeibacter maltaceti (Slapšak et al. 2013) Yamada 2014
 Komagataeibacter medellinensis (Castro et al. 2013) Yamada 2014
 Komagataeibacter melaceti Marič et al. 2020
 Komagataeibacter melomenusus Marič et al. 2020
 Komagataeibacter nataicola (Lisdiyanti et al. 2006) Yamada et al. 2013
 Komagataeibacter oboediens (Sokollek et al. 1998) Yamada et al. 2013
 Komagataeibacter pomaceti Škraban et al. 2019
 Komagataeibacter rhaeticus (Dellaglio et al. 2005) Yamada et al. 2013
 Komagataeibacter saccharivorans (Lisdiyanti et al. 2006) Yamada et al. 2013
 Komagataeibacter sucrofermentans (Toyosaki et al. 1996) Yamada et al. 2013
 Komagataeibacter swingsii (Dellaglio et al. 2005) Yamada et al. 2013
 Komagataeibacter xylinus (Brown 1886) Yamada et al. 2013

See also
 Bacterial taxonomy
 Kombucha
 Microbiology

References 

Bacteria genera
Rhodospirillales